Ladder to Damascus is a 2013 Syrian drama film directed by Mohammad Malas. It was screened in the Contemporary World Cinema section at the 2013 Toronto International Film Festival.

Cast
Najla el Wa'za
Lara Saade
Bilal Martini
Gianna Aanid
Mohamad Zarzour

References

External links

2013 films
2013 drama films
Syrian drama films
2010s Arabic-language films
Films directed by Mohammad Malas